Namaygoosisagagun First Nation is a non-status Ojibwa First Nation near Onamakawash Lake, on the northshore of Collins Lake, northwest of Lake Nipigon; the First Nation is applying for official band status and reserve lands through the Indian and Northern Affairs Canada.  The name "Namaygoosisagagun" comes from Namegosi-zaaga'igan, meaning "Trout Lake," which is the Aboriginal name for Collins Lake. Though Namaygoosisagagun First Nation have about 140 people registered, only about 30 people live in Collins Lake. Collins Lake may be accessed either by Canadian National Railway line or by airplane.

External links
First Nations Forestry Program
Land claims map

Anishinabek Nation
Communities in Thunder Bay District
Ojibwe in Canada
Anishinaabe communities in Canada